Yebbibou (also spelled Yebbi-Bou and Yébibou) is a sub-prefecture of Tibesti Region in Chad.  Towns in Yebbibou sub-prefecture, in addition to Yebbibou itself, include Miski. 

As of the 2009 Chadian national census, the Yebbibou sub-prefecture had a population of 3,859.

References 

Populated places in Chad